Bel Aire is a city in Sedgwick County, Kansas, United States, and a suburb of Wichita.  As of the 2020 census, the population of the city was 8,262.

History
Bel Aire was founded in January 1955 when a group of local residents petitioned the county government to create it as an improvement district for water.

On November 26, 1980, Bel Aire formally incorporated as a city. This was despite a two-year legal dispute with the Wichita city government over whether or not it had the right to do so. The case ultimately went to the Kansas Supreme Court which ruled in Bel Aire's favor.

Geography
Bel Aire is located at  (37.763758, −97.266177) at an elevation of 1,394 feet (425 m). Located on the south side of K-254 in south-central Kansas, Bel Aire is within the Wichita metropolitan area, bordered by Wichita to the south and west and bordered by Kechi to the north.

Demographics

Bel Aire is part of the Wichita, KS Metropolitan Statistical Area.

2010 census
As of the census of 2010, there were 6,769 people, 2,465 households, and 1,854 families living in the city. The racial makeup of the city was 81.1% White, 8.6% African American, 0.9% Native American, 4.5% Asian, 1.4% from other races, and 3.5% from two or more races. Hispanic or Latino of any race were 4.8% of the population.

There were 2,465 households, of which 38.7% had children under the age of 18 living with them, 65.3% were married couples living together, 7.2% had a female householder with no husband present, 2.7% had a male householder with no wife present, and 24.8% were non-families. 21.3% of all households were made up of individuals, and 9.6% had someone living alone who was 65 years of age or older. The average household size was 2.75 and the average family size was 3.21.

The median age in the city was 36 years. 28.3% of residents were under the age of 18; 6.7% were between the ages of 18 and 24; 26.3% were from 25 to 44; 26.9% were from 45 to 64; and 11.6% were 65 years of age or older. The gender makeup of the city was 48.2% male and 51.8% female.

2000 census
As of the census of 2000, there were 5,836 people, 1,976 households, and 1,618 families living in the city. The racial makeup of the city was 85.47% White, 7.32% African American, 0.45% Native American, 3.68% Asian, 0.02% Pacific Islander, 1.10% from other races, and 1.97% from two or more races. Hispanic or Latino of any race were 3.02% of the population.

There were 1,976 households, out of which 47.3% had children under the age of 18 living with them, 73.4% were married couples living together, 6.8% had a female householder with no husband present, and 18.1% were non-families. 15.4% of all households were made up of individuals, and 5.6% had someone living alone who was 65 years of age or older. The average household size was 2.95 and the average family size was 3.30.

In the city, the population was spread out, with 32.9% under the age of 18, 5.2% from 18 to 24, 33.2% from 25 to 44, 21.1% from 45 to 64, and 7.6% who were 65 years of age or older. The median age was 33 years. For every 100 females, there were 98.0 males. For every 100 females age 18 and over, there were 95.1 males.

As of 2000 the median income for a household in the city was $66,937, and the median income for a family was $72,091. Males had a median income of $50,236 versus $35,298 for females. The per capita income for the city was $23,202. About 3.7% of families and 4.8% of the population were below the poverty line, including 8.9% of those under age 18 and 3.0% of those age 65 or over.

Education
The city is served by Wichita USD 259 and Circle USD 375 public school districts. Bel Aire has two private schools as well: Sunrise Christian Academy (Pre-K to 12) and Resurrection Catholic School (Pre-K to 5).

See also
 Northeast Magnet High School - school operated by Wichita USD 259 public school district
 Integra Technologies - Outsourced Semiconductor Assembly And Test (OSAT) service provider

References

Further reading

External links

 City of Bel Aire
 Bel Aire - Directory of Public Officials
 Bel Aire city map, KDOT

Cities in Kansas
Cities in Sedgwick County, Kansas
Wichita, KS Metropolitan Statistical Area
Populated places established in 1955
1955 establishments in Kansas